Bertha van Heukelom (died 1322), was a Dutch noble, the legendary heroine of the Siege of IJsselstein Castle in 1296. She was the daughter of Otto I van Arkel lord of Heukelom (fl. 1254-1283) and married around 1280  to Gijsbrecht van IJsselstein (d. 1344).

In 1296, her spouse was imprisoned in Culemborg by Hubrecht van Vianen of Culemborg as a loyalist of the County of Holland, in the then ongoing local feud between Holland and the bishopric of Utrecht. Bertha defended the castle against the siege by Culemborg during the imprisonment of her spouse. Her defense was reported by Melis Stoke in his Rijmkroniek and made her a local heroine.

References

External links
 http://www.inghist.nl/Onderzoek/Projecten/DVN/lemmata/data/BerthaVanHeukelom

1322 deaths
Year of birth unknown
Women in medieval European warfare
Women in war in the Netherlands
Medieval Dutch nobility
Women in 13th-century warfare
Medieval Dutch women
13th-century women of the Holy Roman Empire
14th-century women of the Holy Roman Empire